The 1950–51 season was Newport County's fourth consecutive season in the Third Division South since relegation from the Second Division at the end of the 1946–47 season. It was the club's 22nd season in the third tier and 23rd season overall in the Football League.

Season review

Results summary

Results by round

Fixtures and results

Third Division South

FA Cup

Welsh Cup

League table

External links
 Newport County 1950-1951 : Results
 Newport County football club match record: 1951
 Welsh Cup 1950/51

References

 Amber in the Blood: A History of Newport County. 

1950-51
English football clubs 1950–51 season
1950–51 in Welsh football